Roy is a surname and a masculine given name.

Roy may also refer to:

Places

Canada
 Roy, British Columbia, a town

United States
 Roy, Idaho, an unincorporated community
 Roy, Louisiana, an unincorporated community
 Roy, Missouri, an unincorporated community
 Roy, Montana, an unincorporated community
 Roy, New Mexico, a village
 Roy, Oregon, an unincorporated historic locale
 Roy, Utah, a city
 Roy station, a Utah Transit Authority commuter rail station
 Roy, Washington, a city

Arts and entertainment
 Roy (film), a 2015 Indian film
 Roy (TV series), an Irish children's programme
 Roy (band), a U.S.-based indie rock band

ROY
 Rookie of the Year (disambiguation)
 ICAO code for Royal Aviation, a Canadian airline
 5-Methyl-2-((2-nitrophenyl)amino)-3-thiophenecarbonitrile (also known as ROY for Red-Orange-Yellow), an organic compound

Other uses
 List of storms named Roy
 Roy's, an American restaurant chain
 Roy's Motel and Café, Amboy, California, U.S.
 Roy River, a tributary of Caopatina Lake, in Quebec, Canada

See also
 
 ROI (disambiguation)